Landulf IV may refer to:

 Landulf IV of Capua (died 961)
 Landulf IV of Benevento (died 982)